The 1937 German Grand Prix was a Grand Prix motor race held at the Nürburgring on 25 July 1937.

Driver Ernst von Delius collided with Richard Seaman during this race on lap 6 and the accident was eventually fatal for von Delius, experiencing thrombosis. Von Delius was 25 years old.

Classification

References

German Grand Prix
German Grand Prix
Grand Prix